The 2010 Saint Louis Athletica season is the second season for the team, after a strong showing in their inaugural year (second place in the regular season and third in the playoffs).

Offseason
In the first WPS expansion draft, Athletica lost two players to the Atlanta Beat.  Atlanta used their second pick (fourth overall) on Athletica forward Amanda Cinalli, and their fifth pick (tenth overall) on defender Sara Larsson, who was the only international player to be taken by either team in the draft.

On September 30, when the WPS free agency period began, all teams announced which players they waived or let become free agents, with Athletica waiving/freeing ten players, while resigning or extending contracts for five other players, after exercising options for another four players two days earlier. Athletica release  Niki Cross was picked up by FC Gold Pride at the end of October, as were Christie Welsh and Sarah Walsh by the Washington Freedom and Boston Breakers, respectively, in mid-February.

On November 23, Athletica put on their website that they had successfully signed Swedish forward Madelaine Edlund and Brazilian midfielder Elaine, both from Umea IK, two bring Athletica's confirmed international count for 2010 up to three.  They also later re-signed Daniela, for a total of four internationals.

The morning day of the 2010 WPS Draft, Athletica traded young goalkeeper Jillian Loyden to the Chicago Red Stars in exchange for Lindsay Tarpley.  Later that day, they drafted UCLA Bruin Kristina Larsen, (second round, 17th overall,) UNC and Pali Blue goalkeeper Ashlyn Harris, (second round, 19th overall,) Santa Clara midfielder Amanda Poach, (third round, 28th overall,) and four other players.

In preparation for the dispersal of the Los Angeles Sol players, Athletica traded Angie Woznuk, Kia McNeill, and rights to Amanda Poach to the Atlanta Beat.  In the dispersal draft, Athletica acquired Shannon Boxx, Aya Miyama, Christina DiMartino, and rights to Cathrine Paaske-Sørensen.

Personnel

Players

Transfers

In
Madelaine Edlund  From Umea IK (11/23/09) International Signing
Elaine  From Umea IK (11/23/09) International Signing
Lindsay Tarpley  From Chicago Red Stars (1/15/10) Trade
Shannon Boxx  From Los Angeles Sol (2/4/10) Dispersal Draft
Aya Miyama  From Los Angeles Sol (2/4/10) Dispersal Draft
Christina DiMartino  From Los Angeles Sol (2/4/10) Dispersal Draft
Niki Cross  From FC Gold Pride (4/1/10) Free Agent

Out
Amanda Cinalli  To Atlanta Beat (9/15/09) Expansion Draft
Sara Larsson  To Atlanta Beat (9/15/09) Expansion Draft
Niki Cross  To FC Gold Pride (10/26/09) Free Agent
Jillian Loyden  To Chicago Red Stars (1/15/10) Trade
Angie Woznuk  To Atlanta Beat (2/2/10) Trade
Kia McNeill  To Atlanta Beat (2/2/10) Trade
Christie Welsh  To Washington Freedom (2/15/10) Free Agent
Sarah Walsh  To Boston Breakers (2/22/10) Free Agent

Released
Ashlee Pistorius 
Erin Kane 
Stephanie Logterman 
Lisa Stoia 
Melissa Tancredi

Club

Preseason
Athletica played four games in the 2010 preseason, double that from 2009.  Wins against the University of Illinois (4-0) and University of Missouri (3-0) were followed by a 2-1 loss against WPS expansion side Atlanta Beat.  Former Athletica player Kia McNeill opened the scoring for the Beat, with Ramona Bachmann (Atlanta) and Shannon Boxx (St. Louis) each adding one later.  Athletica finished the preseason with a 3-0 win against a local boys' academy team.

Regular season
Scores are posted as STL-opponent

Game 1: April 11 vs Bay Area

Game 2: April 17 at Chicago

Game 3: April 25 vs Boston Breakers

Game 4: May 1 at Washington D.C.

Trade: May 5 w/ New Jersey
After a sounding loss to the Washington Freedom, Athletica made a defensive-minded trade with Sky Blue FC, sending India Trotter and their first round draft pick for the 2011 WPS Draft to the New Jersey team, getting in return English international Anita Asante, rights to former Los Angeles Sol player Nikki Washington, and a second round 2011 draft pick.

The trade was actually announced on May 4, but controversy and a league review followed because, last season, Athletica had traded away their 2011 first round draft pick to the Sol.  Unlike the players, the Sol's draft picks had not been dispersed to the other teams, so whether or not that draft pick reverted to Athletica was unknown.  The league approved the trade the following day, though.

Trotter made an appearance for Sky Blue that weekend, though Asante and Washington were not ready to play for Athletica.  Also, to make room for the English international, Athletica waived Brazilian Daniela.

Game 5: May 8 vs Philadelphia

References

American soccer clubs 2010 season
2010
2010 Women's Professional Soccer season
2010 in sports in Missouri